Tortuguero River is a river of Costa Rica. It flows into the Caribbean Sea, near the northeast corner of the country.

References

Rivers of Costa Rica